Hospital! is a 1997 British television special, a one-off comedy described as a cross between ER and Airplane! It aired on Channel 5 on 30 March 1997, the channel's launch date. The cast included Greg Wise, Bob Peck, Celia Imrie, Haydn Gwynne, Julian Clary, Martin Clunes, and Alexei Sayle.

See also
 Green Wing

References

External links

1997 television films
1997 films
1997 comedy films
British comedy films
British television specials
Channel 5 (British TV channel) original programming
Films set in hospitals
1990s British films